There are several Acts of Parliament related to Brexit that are referred to as the European Union (Withdrawal) Act:

 The European Union (Notification of Withdrawal) Act 2017, which empowered the prime minister to invoke Article 50 of the Treaty of the European Union;
 The European Union (Withdrawal) Act 2018, which will repeal European law or transpose it into British law upon Brexit;
 The European Union (Withdrawal) Act 2019, which obliged the prime minister to seek a delay to Brexit;
 The European Union (Withdrawal) (No. 2) Act 2019, which obliges the prime minister to seek a second delay to Brexit.

Brexit